Valebrokk is a Norwegian surname. Notable people with the surname include:

Kåre Valebrokk (1940–2013), Norwegian journalist and television executive
Per Valebrokk (born 1972), Norwegian newspaper editor

Norwegian-language surnames